Cyclophora quercimontaria is a moth of the  family Geometridae. It is found from southern Scandinavia to central and southern Europe and from western Russia to the Caucasus, northern Iran and the northern parts of Asia Minor.

The wingspan is 24–28 mm. Adults are on wing from the end of April to May in one generation per year. Sometimes, a partial second generation develops, with adults on wing from the end of July to the beginning of August.

The larvae feed on Quercus species. The species overwinters as a pupa attached to a branch or twig of the host plant.

References

External links
Lepiforum.de

Moths described in 1897
Cyclophora (moth)
Moths of Europe
Moths of Asia
Taxa named by Max Bastelberger